A friend is a partner in friendship, an interpersonal relationship between humans.

Friend or The Friend may also refer to:

Film
 Friend (1987 film), Soviet film
 Friend (2001 film), South Korean film directed by Kwak Kyung-taek, remade as a 2009 TV series (see below)
 The Friend (2003), German drama directed by Elmar Fischer (original title: Fremder Freund)
 Friend (2018 film), a Kenyan film

Television
 Friend, Our Legend, a South Korean drama, a remake of the 2001 film Friend
 "Friend", an episode of Death Note
 "The Friend", an episode of Frasier "The Friend", an season 3 episode of The Amazing World of Gumball

Literature
 The Friend (Quaker magazine), a British magazine
 The Friend (LDS magazine), a Latter-day Saint children's magazine
 Friend (Henstell novel), a novel by Diana Henstell
 The Friend (novel), a 2018 novel by Sigrid Nunez
 The Friend, monthly newspaper for seamen published in Honolulu by Samuel C. Damon 1843–1867
  The Friend, a short-lived weekly publication (1809-1810) published by Samuel Taylor Coleridge
Friend (Paek novel), a novel by Paek Nam-nyong

Music
 Friend (album), by S.E.S.
 Friend (EP), by Grizzly Bear
 "Friend" (song), a song by Christine McVie
 "Friend", a song by 12 Rods from Gay?
 "Friend", a song by Ayumi Hamasaki, B-side of the single "Poker Face"
 "Friend", a song by Iyaz from Replay
 "Friend", a song by Wild Colonials from Reel Life, Vol. 1

People
 Friend (surname)
 Friend Humphrey (1787–1854), New York politician
 The Public Universal Friend (1752–1819), American preacher
 Friend Smith Rutherford (1824-1864), United States Army officer and lawyer

Places
United States
 Friend, Kansas
 Friend, Nebraska
 Friend, Oregon
 Friend (MBTA station), Boston, Massachusetts, a former Orange Line entrance at the current Haymarket station

Other uses
 Friend (automobile), an American automobile
 Friend (climbing), or spring-loaded camming device, a type of rock climbing anchor
 Friend function, in object-oriented programming, to allow access to private or protected data in a class from outside the class
 Friend class, a class allowed to access data in another class
 Friend of the court, or amicus curiae, a party not involved in a case who offers the court information or other assistance
Friend (Facebook)
Friend (operating system)
 Friend, a member of the Religious Society of Friends (Quakers)

See also
 

 Friends (disambiguation)
 Friendship (disambiguation)
 My Friend (disambiguation)
Frend (disambiguation)
Freind